Cicia Airport  is an airport serving Cicia, one of the Lau Islands in the Eastern Division of Fiji. It is operated by Airports Fiji Limited.

Facilities
It has one runway which measures  in length.

Airlines and destinations

References

External links
 
 Fiji Airways (official site)

Airports in Fiji
Lau Islands